Brave New World is an American television film first shown in 1980. It was also shown on the BBC that same year, and is an adaptation of the 1932 novel of the same name by Aldous Huxley.

Plot

In the future, pregnancy is outlawed, and citizens are required to engage in loveless sex and narcotics are used to ensure happiness in the population. Babies are created in the lab, and every child's future is predestined into one of five classes.

While most people are happy to retain this established order, including Thomas Grambell (Keir Dullea), a supervisor of human "hatcheries," resistance is growing, as evidenced by quirky malcontent Bernard Marx (Bud Cort) and other rebels.

Bernard and his girlfriend Lenina Disney (Marcia Strassman) go to a primitive reservation which holds to 20th century values, and while there meet a native named John (also called the Savage) (Kristoffer Tabori). They return with him to civilization, and his presence further upends conventional thinking. John is seen as a freak and this grants him some degree of celebrity. John develops romantic feelings for Lenina, which are considered highly inappropriate, bordering on the obscene.

John's parents are from the more technologically advanced part of the world, and he has educated himself using often banned works such as Shakespeare. John realizes that his sexual mores, based on the works he studied, are antiquated in this advanced society. He therefore asks to be assigned a solitary posting, but even as he mans the lighthouse alone, he cannot escape his memories of Lenina.

Cast
 Kristoffer Tabori as John the Savage
 Bud Cort as Bernard Marx
 Keir Dullea as Thomas "Tomakin" Grahambell
 Julie Cobb as Linda Lysenko
 Ron O'Neal as Mustapha Mond
 Marcia Strassman as Lenina Disney (Crowne) 
 Dick Anthony Williams as Helmholtz Watson
 Jonelle Allen as Fanny Crowne 
 Jeanetta Arnette as Dwightina 
 Casey Biggs as Beta lighthouse guard 
 Reb Brown as Henry 
 Tara Buckman as Alpha Teacher 
 Nigel Bullard as Plant Manager 
 Shane Butterworth as John as a child
 Lee Chamberlin as Head Nurse 
 Beatrice Colen as Gamma Female 
 Patrick Cronin as Gamma Male 
 Valerie Curtin as Chief Warden Stelina Shell 
 Murray Salem as Chief Engineer
 Marneen Fields as Futuristic Factory Worker 
 Aron Kincaid as J. Edgar Millhouse 
 Carole Mallory as Miss Trotsky 
 Tricia O'Neil as Maoina Krupps 
 Victoria Racimo as Beta Teacher 
 Delia Salvi as High Priestess

Production

Originally 4 hours long, it was cut down to three hours before being televised. Brave New World was directed by Burt Brinckerhoff for Universal Television and first shown on NBC on 7 March 1980. The screen adaptation was written by Doran William Cannon. It was filmed in Universal City, California.

Awards and nominations

Reception

TCM found the film ambitious but tedious, confusing and ultimately unsuccessful.

Home media
The film was released on DVD.

See also
Brave New World (1998 film)
Brave New World (2020 TV series)

References

External links

1980 television films
1980 films
NBC network original films
Films based on science fiction novels
American dystopian films
1980s dystopian films
Films set in the 26th century
1980 science fiction films
Films based on British novels
Films based on works by Aldous Huxley
Brave New World
American science fiction television films
Films scored by Paul Chihara
Films directed by Burt Brinckerhoff
1980s English-language films
1980s American films